The 1959 Missouri Tigers football team was an American football team that represented the University of Missouri in the Big Seven Conference (Big 7) during the 1959 NCAA University Division football season. The team compiled a 6–5 record (4–2 against Big 7 opponents), finished in second place in the Big 7, lost to Georgia in the 1960 Orange Bowl, was ranked No. 17 in the final AP Poll, and outscored opponents by a combined total of 125 to 124. Dan Devine was the head coach for the second of 13 seasons. The team played its home games at Memorial Stadium in Columbia, Missouri.

The team's statistical leaders included Mel West with 556 rushing yards and 556 yards of total offense, Phil Snowden with 415 passing yards, Russ Sloan with 128 receiving yards, and Donnie Smith with 24 point scored.

Schedule

References

Missouri
Missouri Tigers football seasons
Missouri Tigers football